John Penn (11 March 1921 – 14 February 2007) was a British architect.  He was born in Greens Norton, Northamptonshire, and died in Ipswich, Suffolk.

Penn was educated at Eton, and then at Trinity College, Cambridge. He studied History at Cambridge, and his studies were interrupted when he served in the Second World War. During his time in the military, he won the Military Cross for bravery.

He spent some time in the United States with Richard Neutra and his buildings were influenced by the Case Study Houses. His work includes a factory, and a pavilion for Trinity College, Cambridge, and several private houses in Suffolk.

References

1921 births
2007 deaths
People educated at Eton College
Alumni of Trinity College, Cambridge
Architects from Northamptonshire